Gyaman (also spelled Jamang, Gyaaman) was a medieval Akan people state, located in what is now the Bono region of Ghana and Ivory Coast. Gyaman was founded by the Bono people, a branch of the Akan, in the late 15th century. The Bono then proceeded to conquer the Kulangos, Nafanas, Ligbis, and other ethnic groups of the area.

Before European colonial administration in the late 19th century, the Gyaman king, known as the Gyamanhene, sat in Amanvi, although four provincial chiefs held the kingdom's real power. The economy centered on the capital Sampa and the Dyula market town of Bonduku in modern-day Ivory Coast. The adinkra symbols are originated and designed through the handiwork and tireless effort of Bonohene Nana Kwadwo Agyemang Adinkra of Gyaman.

In the 19th century, Gyaman was subjugated by the Ashanti Empire. It regained its independence following the Ashanti defeat by the British. In 1888, Gyaman king Agyeman signed a treaty of protection with France, but the French failed to establish a post in the kingdom, leaving it vulnerable to Samori's 1895 invasion. The French later expelled Samori in 1897, incorporating western areas of Gyaman into French West Africa.

See also
List of rulers of the Akan state of Gyaaman

References

Countries in medieval Africa
History of Ivory Coast
French West Africa
History of Ghana
States and territories established in 1450
Akan
Former monarchies